Panteones is a station serving Line 2 of the Mexico City Metro. It is located in the Colonia Argentina district of the Miguel Hidalgo borough of the Mexican Federal District. Panteón means "cemetery" in Spanish; the station's name and logo come from the nearby graveyards.  The station was opened as part of a westward extension of Line 2 on 22 August 1984.

From 23 April to 24 June 2020, the station was temporarily closed due to the COVID-19 pandemic in Mexico.

Ridership

Nearby
Panteón Español, a graveyard
Panteón Sanctorum, a graveyard

Gallery

References

External links 

Panteones
Railway stations opened in 1984
1984 establishments in Mexico
Mexico City Metro stations in Miguel Hidalgo, Mexico City